Communauté d'agglomération Lannion-Trégor Communauté is an intercommunal structure, centred on the city of Lannion. It is located in the Côtes-d'Armor department, in the Brittany region, western France. It was created in January 2017. Its seat is in Lannion. Its area is 904.4 km2. Its population was 99,607 in 2017, of which 19,880 in Lannion proper.

Composition
The communauté d'agglomération consists of the following 57 communes:

Berhet
Camlez
Caouënnec-Lanvézéac
Cavan
Coatascorn
Coatréven
Kerbors
Kermaria-Sulard
Langoat
Lanmérin
Lanmodez
Lannion
Lanvellec
Lézardrieux
Loguivy-Plougras
Louannec
Mantallot
Minihy-Tréguier
Penvénan
Perros-Guirec
Plestin-les-Grèves
Pleubian
Pleudaniel
Pleumeur-Bodou
Pleumeur-Gautier
Plouaret
Ploubezre
Plougras
Plougrescant
Plouguiel
Ploulec'h
Ploumilliau
Plounérin
Plounévez-Moëdec
Plouzélambre
Plufur
Pluzunet
Prat
Quemperven
La Roche-Jaudy
Rospez
Saint-Michel-en-Grève
Saint-Quay-Perros
Tonquédec
Trébeurden
Trédarzec
Trédrez-Locquémeau
Tréduder
Trégastel
Trégrom
Tréguier
Trélévern
Trémel
Trévou-Tréguignec
Trézény
Troguéry
Le Vieux-Marché

References

Lannion-Tregor
Lannion-Tregor